Joseph Stacher (c. 1902 – 1977) (alias Doc Stacher, Joseph Rosen, Doc Harris el al) was a Jewish syndicate leader who helped bring together the Jewish and Italian Mafia into a national organized crime syndicate.

Early life
Joseph Stacher was born Gdale Oistaczer (commonly pronounced Gedalia) in Letichev, Russia around 1902. He emigrated with his family to the United States in 1912. As a teenager living in Newark, New Jersey, he became friends with Meyer Lansky and Abner Zwillman. He attained United States citizenship in May 1930, but his naturalization was later revoked.

Career
By the 1920s Stacher was running much of Zwillman's gambling operations. In 1931, Stacher helped Meyer Lansky organize a conference of Jewish organized crime leaders at the Franconia Hotel, which later would see the alleged merging of the Jewish and Italian Mafia into a national crime syndicate. Running West Coast and Caribbean gambling operations for Lansky during the 1930s, as well as becoming a silent partner of movie studio Columbia Pictures in the late 1930s, Stacher would later supervise gambling in Las Vegas, Nevada, particularly the Sands and Fremont Casinos.

Stacher continued running Mafia gambling operations until 1964, when Federal authorities arrested him for tax evasion. While the US government was in favor of deporting him to his native Poland, federal law prohibited deporting anyone to a communist-controlled country. However, because of the "Law of Return", Stacher was allowed citizenship in Israel and successfully immigrated there in 1965.

While living in Israel he served as the primary source of Israeli journalists Dennis Eisenberg, Uri Dan, and Eli Landau for a biography of Meyer Lansky. Stacher continued living in Israel until his death.

Death
Stacher died, according to some reports in a Munich, West Germany, hotel room on February 28, 1977. His death was reported as a heart attack and his body shipped back to Israel. He was buried secretly and the nameplate of his grave was altered to hide his burial site. Only eight men were at the funeral, so the family had to ask a reporter and photographer to join the ceremony in order to attain a minyan.

References 

Sifakis, Carl: The Encyclopedia of American Crime: Second Edition Vol. II (K–Z). New York: Facts On File, 2001.
Englisch, T. J.: Havana Nocturne: How the Mob Owned Cuba ... and Then Lost It to the Revolution; The New York Times 2007, 2008; 

La Cosa Nostra Database 
Tough Jews, 2006 
Kefauver Final Report 
FBI File Abner Zwillman 
Mob History Hotel Franconia Raid 
Dennis Eisenberg, Uri Dan, Eli Landau, Lansky's mob helps the war effort, then helps itself to gambling profit, Lakeland Ledger - Nov 4, 1979 
John William Tuohy, 2001, The American Mafia 

Further reading
Chapin, David A. and Weinstock, Ben, The Road from Letichev: The history and culture of a forgotten Jewish community in Eastern Europe, Volume 2.  iUniverse, Lincoln, Neb., 2000, pp. 475–477.
Dennis Eisenberg, Uri Dan, Eli Landau, 1979, Meyer Lansky: mogul of the mob''

1900s births
1977 deaths
People from Letychiv
Jews from the Russian Empire
Ukrainian Jews
Emigrants from the Russian Empire to the United States
American people of Ukrainian-Jewish descent
Jewish American gangsters
20th-century American Jews